= Mexican League =

Mexican League may refer to:

- Mexican Baseball League, a baseball league based in Mexico
- Mexican Pacific League, a winter baseball league also based in Mexico
- Liga MX, the top Mexican association football league
